Athletes from the Algeria competed at the 1996 Summer Paralympics in Atlanta, United States.

Competitors
Algeria had a 9-member large delegation in Atlanta, all of whom were men.  They would not send women until the 2000 Games.

Medallists

Events

Athletics

Men–track

Men–field

Judo

Men

See also
Algeria at the Paralympics
Algeria at the 1996 Summer Olympics

References 

Nations at the 1996 Summer Paralympics
1996
Summer Paralympics